Venus Lake (also called Lake Kechewaishke or Kechewaishke Lake) is a small mesotrophic rural lake in Oneida County in northern Wisconsin in the United States, at the intersection of U.S. Route 45 and U.S. Route 8, about  north of Pelican Lake and adjacent to the small settlement of Monico. The slightly smaller Mars Lake and the somewhat larger Neptune Lake are nearby, to the northwest.

Venus Lake is used for fishing. Panfish species include Largemouth Bass and Northern Pike, and Walleye and Bluegill. Rusty Crayfish, a rapidly expanding invasive species, are present in the lake. There is no boat ramp.

References

Lakes of Oneida County, Wisconsin